KLMT may refer to:

 The ICAO code for Klamath Falls Airport
 KLMT (FM), a radio station (89.3 FM) licensed to Billings, Montana, United States
 Common misspelling of Clint